Valentina may refer to:

Entertainment

Film
 Valentina (1950 film), a 1950 Argentine film
 Valentina (2008 film), a 2008 Argentine film

Television
 Valentina (1993 telenovela), a 1993 Mexican telenovela
 Valentina (2013 telenovela), an upcoming 2013 Chilean telenovela by TVN
 Valentina (TV series), an Italian television series

Comics
 Valentina (Philippine comics), a supervillainess in the Filipino comic book Darna
 Valentina (comics), an Italian comic book by Guido Crepax
 Valentina Allegra de Fontaine, a fictional espionage agent in the Marvel Comics universe

Music
 Valentina (album), a 2012 album by English band The Wedding Present
 "Valentina", a song about Valentina Tereshkova by Public Service Broadcasting from the 2015 album The Race for Space

Names 
 Valentina (given name), a female given name
 Valentina Tereshkova (born 1937), the first and youngest woman to have flown in space
 Elizabeth Miklosi (born 1983), a.k.a. "Valentina", an American professional wrestler
 Elena Ferretti (born 1960), Italian eurobeat and italo disco singer who uses "Valentina" and many other aliases
 Valentina (fashion designer) (1899–1989), a Ukrainian fashion designer
 Valentina (drag queen) (born 1991), an American drag performer, actor, television personality and singer
 Valentina (singer) (born 2009), French singer, winner of the 2020 Junior Eurovision Song Contest
 Valentina Shevchenko, Kyrgyzstani-Peruvian mixed martial artist

Other uses
 Valentina (hot sauce), a Mexican hot sauce
 Valentina (software), an open source software tool for pattern drafting
 Kickin' Valentina, a rock band

See also
 Valentino (disambiguation)
 Valentine (disambiguation)